Trinity Memorial Church may refer to:

 Trinity Memorial Church (Denver, Colorado)
 Trinity Memorial Church (Binghamton, New York)